Morel, born before 1783 – died in 1802, was a French 18th–19th-century playwright and writer of Comédie en vaudevilles. His first name has always been unknown. 

Morel's short career may suggest that he was the pseudonym of a more famous author unidentified to date. Joseph-Marie Quérard in his 1834 book La France Littéraire writes "MOREL, died in 1802, aged 19" with no further information and Léon Thiessé in his Essai biographique et littéraire "We have named Morel, who died in 1802 aged twenty-one from a chest disease, who left some nice songs, and a political work almost unknown".

Works 
1799: Le Café des artistes, one-act Comédie en vaudeville, with Charles-Guillaume Étienne and Charles Gaugiran-Nanteuil
1799: L'intérieur d'un comité révolutionnaire, ou les jacobins, par moi
1799: Les Dieux à Tivoli, ou l'Ascension de l'Olympe, folie non fastueuse, arlequinade, impromptu in 1 act and vaudevilles, with Charles-Guillaume Étienne, Francis baron d'Allarde and Joseph Servières
1799: Rembrandt, ou la Vente après décès, vaudeville anecdotique en 1 acte, with Étienne and Servières
1800: Jacasset, ou la Contrainte par corps, comedy in 1 act and in prose, with Philibert
1801: Colombine toute seule, scène-parade, mingled with comédies en vaudeville, with Joseph Marty and Philibert
1801: Quel est le plus ridicule ? ou La Gravure en action, one-act folie-vaudeville, with Étienne Crétu with Étienne Gosse

References 

 

18th-century French dramatists and playwrights
19th-century French dramatists and playwrights
1802 deaths